Fabio Colangelo (born 25 August 1981) is a retired Italian tennis player.

Colangelo has a career high ATP singles ranking of 4 achieved on 26 June 2006. He also has a career high ATP doubles ranking of 154 achieved on 9 June 2008.

Colangelo has three ATP main draw appearances, all in doubles, as well as four Challenger titles.

External links

1981 births
Living people
Italian male tennis players
20th-century Italian people
21st-century Italian people